Gus Franklin Mutscher (November 19, 1932 – February 26, 2023) was an American politician who was Speaker of the Texas House of Representatives, having served from 1969 to 1972. He was one of several Texas politicians indicted in the Sharpstown bank stock fraud scandal. He was convicted and sentenced to five years probation for conspiring to accept a bribe. Mutscher, however, was later cleared on appeal.

Mutscher's opponents, many within his own Democratic Party, were known as the "Dirty 30"; their ranks included Joseph Hugh Allen of Baytown, Carlos Truan of Corpus Christi, and Robert Gammage of Houston.

Early life 
Mutscher was born in the community of William Penn in Washington County on November 19, 1932. He attended the William Penn Common School and graduated from Brenham High School in Brenham. He attended Blinn College, the community college of Washington County in Brenham, on a baseball scholarship, he graduated with an Associate of Arts degree. Mutscher then enrolled in the University of Texas at Austin, from which he procured a Bachelor of Business Administration degree in 1956 and a reserve commission in the United States Army.

Political career 
While working for the Borden Company, Mutscher was first elected in 1960, at the age of twenty-eight, to the Texas House of Representatives in 1960, when the Kennedy/Johnson slate narrowly won in Texas.

After his legislative service, Mutscher was first appointed and then elected as the administrative county judge of his native Washington County. He resided in the county seat of Brenham.

Personal life and death 
Mutscher married the 1964 Miss America, Donna Axum of El Dorado, Arkansas; the marriage ended in divorce; she remarried and resided with her third husband in Fort Worth.

Mutscher died on February 26, 2023, at the age of 90.

References

References 
 

1932 births
2023 deaths
Blinn College alumni
Speakers of the Texas House of Representatives
Democratic Party members of the Texas House of Representatives
County judges in Texas
People from Brenham, Texas
Military personnel from Texas
United States Army officers
McCombs School of Business alumni
20th-century American politicians